Barry Benjamin McKinnon (born 1944) is a Canadian poet.

Born in Calgary, Alberta, he taught English at the College of New Caledonia in Prince George, British Columbia.

Bibliography

 The Golden Daybreak Hair. Toronto, ON: Aliquondo Press, 1967.
 The Carcasses of Spring. Vancouver, BC: Talonbooks, 1971.
 I Wanted to Say Something. Prince George, BC: Caledonia Writing Series, 1975.
 Death of a Lyric Poet. Prince George, BC: Caledonia Writing Series, 1975.
 Songs & Speeches. Prince George, BC: Caledonia Writing Series, 1976.
 Sex at Thirty One. Prince George, BC: Caledonia Writing Series, 1977.
 The The. (Fragments). Prince George, BC: Repository /Gorse Press, 1979.
 The The. Toronto, ON: Coach House Press, 1980. (Nominated for the 1981 Governor General's Award)
 Thoughts/Sketches. North Vancouver, BC: Tatlow/Gorse, 1985.
 I Wanted to Say Something. Red Deer, AB: Red Deer College Press, 1990.
 Pulplog. Prince George, BC: Caitlin Press, 1991.
 Four Realities: poets from northern BC. Prince George, BC: Caitlin Press, 1992.
 Arrythmia. Prince George, BC: Gorse Press, 1994.
 The Centre. Prince George, BC: Caitlin Press, 1995.

Awards

 bp Nichol Chap-Book Award, 2004.  Bolivia/Peru
 bp Nichol Chap-Book Award, 1995.  Arrythmia
 Dorothy Livesay Poetry Prize, 1992.  Pulplog
 Governor General's Literary Award, 1981 (finalist)  The The

References

External links 
Records of Barry McKinnon are held by Simon Fraser University's Special Collections and Rare Books
Barry McKinnon fonds (2000.6) at Northern BC Archives

1944 births
Living people
20th-century Canadian poets
Canadian male poets
Writers from Calgary
20th-century Canadian male writers